Jörn Renzenbrink and Markus Zoecke were the defending champions but did not compete that year.

Marius Barnard and Piet Norval won in the final 6–7, 6–4, 6–4 against Paul Kilderry and Michael Tebbutt.

Seeds

  Patrick Rafter /  Jonathan Stark (quarterfinals, withdrew)
  Brian MacPhie /  Sandon Stolle (first round)
  Marius Barnard /  Piet Norval (champions)
  Paul Kilderry /  Michael Tebbutt (final)

Draw

References
 1996 Miller Lite Hall of Fame Championships Doubles Draw

1996 Hall of Fame Tennis Championships